Druid Hills is a community which includes both a census-designated place (CDP) in unincorporated DeKalb County, Georgia, United States, as well as a neighborhood of the city of Atlanta. The CDP's population was 14,568 at the 2010 census. The CDP formerly contained the main campus of Emory University and the Centers for Disease Control and Prevention (CDC) however they were annexed by Atlanta in 2018. The Atlanta-city section of Druid Hills is one of Atlanta's most affluent neighborhoods with a mean household income in excess of $238,500 (making it the ninth most affluent, per that metric).

History
The planned community was initially conceived by Joel Hurt, and developed with the effort of Atlanta's leading families, including Coca-Cola founder Asa Candler. It contains some of Atlanta's historic mansions from the late 19th and early 20th century. Druid Hills includes the main campus of Emory University, which relocated to Atlanta in 1914.

Druid Hills was designed by Frederick Law Olmsted and was one of his last commissions.  A showpiece of the design was the string of parks along Ponce de Leon Avenue, which was designated as Druid Hills Parks and Parkways and listed on the National Register of Historic Places on April 11, 1975.  The remainder of the development was listed on the Register as the Druid Hills Historic District on October 25, 1979.  Later the Park and Parkways district was consolidated into the Druid Hills Historic District. The other historic districts in Druid Hills are:

 Emory University District, added in 1975
 University Park-Emory Highlands-Emory Estates Historic District, added in 1998
 Emory Grove Historic District, added in 2000.

By 2015 there was a bill in the Georgia Legislature which called for annexing more of Druid Hills into Atlanta.

Geography
Druid Hills is located at  (33.787205, -84.325974).

The CDP's northern boundary is the South Fork of Peachtree Creek; the CSX track and the Decatur city limits are the eastern boundary; the DeKalb County line is the western boundary; and the southern boundary is the Atlanta city limit.

The Druid Hills neighborhood of Atlanta is bounded by the Druid Hills CDP (i.e. unincorporated DeKalb County) on the north and east; the Morningside/Lenox Park, Virginia-Highland and Poncey-Highland neighborhoods of Atlanta on the west; and the Candler Park neighborhood of Atlanta on the south.

The Chelsea Heights neighborhood is located in the eastern part of the CDP at the Decatur border, and participates in the Druid Hills Civic Association.

Demographics

2020 census

As of the 2020 United States census, there were 9,429 people, 3,579 households, and 1,977 families residing in the CDP.

2000 census
As of the census of 2000, there were 12,742 people, 4,627 households, and 2,040 families residing in the CDP. The racial makeup of the CDP was 84.15% White, 6.0% African-American, 0.16% Native American, 7.34% Asian, 0.07% Pacific Islander, 0.64% from other races, and 1.64% from two or more races. Hispanic or Latino of any race were 2.43% of the population.

There were 4,627 households, out of which 18.9% had children under the age of 18 living with them, 37.5% were married couples living together, 4.7% had a female householder with no husband present, and 55.9% were non-families. 37.4% of all households were made up of individuals, and 10.0% had someone living alone who was 65 years of age or older.  The average household size was 2.06 and the average family size was 2.80.

In the CDP, the population was spread out, with 13.0% under the age of 18, 30.2% from 18 to 24, 30.7% from 25 to 44, 16.5% from 45 to 64, and 9.6% who were 65 years of age or older.  The median age was 28 years. For every 100 females, there were 91.5 males.  For every 100 females age 18 and over, there were 88.2 males.

The median income for a household in the CDP was $62,953, and the median income for a family was $106,196. Males had a median income of $57,017 versus $45,458 for females. The per capita income for the CDP was $34,829.  About 2.3% of families and 7.7% of the population were below the poverty line, including 3.5% of those under age 18 and 4.2% of those age 65 or over.

Economy

Emory University, including its hospitals, is the third largest employer in Metro Atlanta as of 2007/8. The CDC is also an employer of note.

Commercial areas include Emory Village, a small node first developed in the 1920s at the terminus of the streetcar line to Emory. A revitalization of the area was completed in 2011 with new sidewalks, street furniture and two new roundabouts.

The other, larger commercial areas fall just outside the community's boundaries, such as the Clairmont Road corridor in North Decatur, the Sage Hill shopping center in Atlanta's Morningside/Lenox Park, and the Ponce de Leon Avenue corridor just west of Druid Hills in Atlanta's Poncey-Highland/Virginia-Highland.

Arts and culture

Druid Hills is home to The Atlanta Boy Choir on S. Ponce de Leon Ave. and Callanwolde Fine Arts Center, housed in the Gothic-Tudor style former estate of Charles Howard Candler, president of Coca-Cola and eldest son of Asa Griggs Candler, Coca-Cola's co-founder.

Parks
 Baker Woodland, Emory University, between Fishburne Dr. & South Kilga Cir. Forest of oak, tulip poplar, beech, and hickory trees - contains over 100 plant species.
 Burbanck Park, Oxford Rd. & Clifton Rd.   natural park which borders Peavine Creek. It is named after Madeline and William Burbanck, Emory University professors who owned the property.
 Fernbank Forest, Fernbank Museum of Natural History.
 Fernbank School Park, 157 Heaton Park Dr. This DeKalb County  park is located west of the CSX railroad tracks. It includes a multi-use field and court, playground, picnic area and walking trails.
 Hahn Woods, Emory University, Houston Mill Rd. (at South Peachtree Creek). Nature preserve with trail and viewing platform over the creek.
 Medlock Park North Druid Hills subdivision, Nine little league baseball fields with concessions, playground and a running/cycling trail which follows Nancy Creek.
 Olmsted Linear Park, Druid Hills, Ponce de Leon Ave.  of six distinct parks, strung along Ponce de Leon Avenue like a necklace. They were designed by Frederick Law Olmsted in the late 19th century.  Each of the six parks has its own name: Deepdene, Dellwood, Shadyside, Springdale, Virgilee and Oak Grove (formerly Brightwood).
 Wesley Woods Forest, Emory University.
 Princeton Way Park, a small neighborhood park that is surrounded by the interior homes of Princeton Way. The park is equipped with picnic tables, swings, slides, a sandbox, short walking trails, and an informal baseball setup.

Government 

The neighborhood organization, the Druid Hills Civic Association (DHCA), gives input to two authorities since the community is divided between the city of Atlanta and unincorporated territory in DeKalb County.

The Atlanta part is an official recognized neighborhood of Atlanta, which in turn is part of NPU N. Officially, DHCA exercises its input into planning and other city processes by giving input to the NPU.

DeKalb County does not have an officially designated role for the community within the county government in the way the City of Atlanta does (though there are five large geographic districts for the election of county commissioners), so the DHCA gives input to the unitarian county government in Decatur.

The United States Postal Service operates the Druid Hills Post Office at 1799 Briarcliff Road NE in the North Druid Hills CDP in unincorporated DeKalb.

The Centers for Disease Control and Prevention's main offices were formerly located in the CDP. The City of Atlanta annexed the CDC effective January 1, 2018.

Infrastructure

Transportation
Public bus transportation is provided by the Metropolitan Atlanta Rapid Transit Authority, while Emory University runs an extensive fleet of shuttles, called the "Cliff".

Healthcare
Emory University Hospital and Children's Healthcare of Atlanta - Egleston Hospital are in the Druid Hills area.

The City of Atlanta annexed Egleston and Emory University effective January 1, 2018. Prior to the annexation, Egleston was in Druid Hills CDP, as was Emory Hospital.

Education

Primary and secondary schools
Druid Hills resides in the DeKalb County School District. Most residents are zoned to Fernbank Elementary School (in the Druid Hills CDP) while some are zoned to Briar Vista Elementary School. All residents are zoned to Druid Hills Middle School (in the North Decatur CDP), and Druid Hills High School (in the Druid Hills CDP).

The Paideia School  is a nearby preK–12 private school  in the city of Atlanta.

Colleges and universities
Emory University is a private university formerly located in the Druid Hills CDP. The City of Atlanta annexed Emory effective January 1, 2018.

Religion

Churches
 Atlanta Metropolitan Cathedral, 999 Briarcliff Rd.
 Atlanta Primitive Baptist Church, 1367 S Ponce De Leon Ave.
 Emory Presbyterian Church (PCUSA), 1886 N Decatur Rd.
 Church of the Epiphany (AEC), 2089 Ponce De Leon Ave.
 Druid Hills Baptist Church (CBF), Ponce de Leon Ave. & N. Highland Ave.
 Druid Hills Presbyterian Church (PCUSA), 1026 Ponce De Leon Ave.
 Druid Hills United Methodist Church (UMC), Ponce de Leon Ave. & Briarcliff Rd. - built 1955, Ivey and Crook, architects
 Glenn Memorial United Methodist Church (UMC), 1660 N. Decatur Rd.
 The Church of Jesus Christ of Latter-Day Saints (Mormon), 1450 Ponce De Leon Ave.
 St. Elias Antiochian Orthodox Church, 2045 Ponce de Leon Ave.
 Saint John's Lutheran Church (ELCA), 1410 Ponce de Leon Ave.
 St. John Chrysostom Melkite Church,  1428 Ponce De Leon Ave.
 The International Society for Krishna Consciousness, 1287 S. Ponce De Leon Ave.

Villa International, a Christian ministry that consists of a two-story 33-room guest house for visiting academics and medical staff from multiple countries, was established in 1972 to provide a welcoming environment in response to the suicide of an African academic in 1966. The initial cost to establish it was $300,000, and by 2020 it gained the nickname "Little U.N." from its guests. The City of Atlanta annexed Villa International effective January 1, 2018. Prior to that date it was in the Druid Hills CDP.

Synagogues are located in adjacent Virginia-Highland, Morningside/Lenox Park and North Druid Hills, the latter having one of the largest concentrations of Orthodox Jews in Metro Atlanta.

Notable people
Cully Cobb, founder of the Cobb Institute of Archaeology at Mississippi State University

See also
 Druid Hills Golf Club
 Emory Grove Historic District

Bibliography
 Bryant, James C. Druid Hills Golf Club in Atlanta: The Story and the People, 1912–1997. Atlanta, Ga.: Druid Hills Golf Club, 1998
 Hartle, Robert, Jr.  Atlanta's Druid Hills: A Brief History. The History Press, June 27, 2008.

References

External links

Druid Hills Civic Association
Druid Hills Historic District
Arbor Atlanta: Hahn Woods
Wesley Woods Forest
Emory University Walking Tour
Emory Village historic preservation incl. history of Emory Village

 
Census-designated places in the Atlanta metropolitan area
Census-designated places in DeKalb County, Georgia
Frederick Law Olmsted works
Historic districts in Georgia (U.S. state)
Neighborhoods in DeKalb County, Georgia